Yaylımlı can refer to:

 Yaylımlı, Aşkale
 Yaylımlı, Tut